Herman Nyberg (11 July 1863 – 12 February 1947) was a Swedish sports shooter. He competed in the men's trap event at the 1912 Summer Olympics.

References

1863 births
1947 deaths
Swedish male sport shooters
Olympic shooters of Sweden
Shooters at the 1912 Summer Olympics
Sport shooters from Stockholm